An election to Carlow County Council took place on 20 June 1985 as part of that year's Irish local elections. 21 councillors were elected from four electoral divisions by PR-STV voting for a six-year term of office.

Results by party

Results by Electoral Area

Borris

Carlow

Muinebheag

Tullow

External links

 Official website
 irishelectionliterature

1985 Irish local elections
1985